Theodore "Tiger" Flowers (August 5, 1895 – November 16, 1927) was an American professional boxer. Nicknamed "The Georgia Deacon", he rose to prominence in the early 20th century, becoming the first African-American World Middleweight Boxing Champion after defeating Harry Greb to claim the title in 1926.  He was inducted into The Ring Hall of Fame in 1971, The Georgia Sports Hall of Fame in 1976, The World Boxing Hall of Fame in 1990, and The International Boxing Hall of Fame in 1993.
A left-handed fighter, Flowers was fast and elusive, usually avoiding heavy punishment while landing quick, sharp blows. He died on November 16, 1927, aged 32, almost 60 years before Sugar Ray Leonard beat Marvelous Marvin Hagler.

A celebrated African-American prizefighter,  Flowers is considered a trailblazer of his era, competing during a time when the boxing profession was predominantly white. Flowers is often compared, in precedence, to fighters George Dixon, the first black boxing champion who won the Bantamweight World Title in 1892, Barbados Joe Walcott, first black to win the World Welterweight title on December 18, 1901, Joe Gans, the first black to win the World Lightweight Title in 1902, and also the more controversial Jack Johnson, the first black to win the World Heavyweight Title in 1908.

In addition to becoming the first black Middleweight champion, Tiger’s unprecedented accumulation of wins (136) and knockouts (56) in his career spanning less than ten years proved to many skeptics that African-Americans could compete at the highest level. Prominent Atlanta area rapper Killer Mike, of Run the Jewels, memorialized Tiger Flowers in the song “Kill Your Masters” on RTJ3

Personal life
His parents, Aaron Flowers (1878-1957) married Lula Dawson (1875-1949) on December 28, 1888, Married in Camillia, Georgia. Theodore Flowers (born February 11, 1895) was born in Mitchell County, Georgia.

Flowers’ had 5 siblings Carl Flowers (1896-1978), Gertrude (1898-?), Oc or Osee (1900-1992), Uly Smith (1908-?), Cecil Nathan(1910-1992).

Theodore Flowers married Willie Mae Spellers on November 22, 1915, and has a daughter named Verna Lee Flowers (Jackson) September 9, 1921, and Died April 18, 2021, at Martin Luther King Jr. Community Hospital
in Los Angeles, California.

Professional career

After working as a stevedore on the Georgia coast, Flowers temporarily relocated to Philadelphia, Pennsylvania in 1918; this is where he ultimately began boxing professionally at the age of 23.

By early 1920 he started training with manager Walk Miller. Over the next six years the lightning-quick lefthander competed all over the country in a grueling ascent to the top of the boxing ranks.

Flowers combined showmanship inside the ropes with a public persona characterized by sobriety and religious devotion; eventually becoming donned “The Deacon”. He famously carried a Bible into the ring for each fight and also shared scripture. A devoutly religious man, Flowers would recite a passage from Psalm 144 before every bout throughout his career.

Flowers’ first bout was a victory over fighter Billy Hooper; which he followed up with an impressive two-dozen straight victories before suffering his first loss to Panama Joe Gans.

Like many other African-American boxers of the time period, Flowers found it difficult to obtain fights with white fighters early in his career. He found himself primarily having to fight men of his own race, and many times over, in order to make a living. Despite this, during his era Flowers challenged many high-caliber fighters, including Maxie Rosenbloom, Sam Langford, Kid Norfolk, Johnny Wilson, Jamaica Kid, Mickey Walker and many other future Hall of Fame inductees.

By 1924, after being rated the number-one contender for Harry Greb's middleweight title by The Ring magazine, Flowers earned a shot at Greb; despite previously losing a questionable decision to light heavyweight champion Mike McTigue.

On February 26, 1926, before a crowd of 16,311 at Madison Square Garden, Flowers dethroned champion Harry Greb by split decision. He would also defeat Greb once more on August 19, 1926 to defend the title, although both match results were considered questionable.

Tiger's next and final championship bout came against Mickey Walker on December 3, 1926 in Chicago, where he was defeated for the title. A match decided by points in the end, it was considered a controversial decision in the eyes of many. The match later was investigated by the Illinois Athletic Commission, but the decision was not overturned.

Flowers immediately set his sights on a rematch to regain the title, but tragically his career would be cut short before ever gaining the opportunity.

Flowers’ final match, a victory over Leo Gates, was fought November 12, 1927.

Death
Flowers was hospitalized in New York City in early November 1927, requiring surgery to remove scar tissue from around his eyes. Complications from the surgery ultimately resulted in his death on November 16, 1927 at age 32.

The tragic circumstances of Tiger’s death were similar to what caused the death of former champion Harry Greb about a year prior.

Posthumously, Theodore Flowers was honored as one of the greatest fighters of his era. The International Boxing Research Organization would rank him as number 12 on their list of Greatest Middleweights of All Time. Boxing historian Bert Sugar placed him 68th in his Top 100 Fighters catalog. The Bleacher Report named him the number 6 greatest southpaw in boxing history.

An important figure in Atlanta, Georgia's black community, Tiger was remembered as a deacon for the Butler Street CME Church and as a member of the lodges of Masons, Elks, and Knights of Pythias. His house on Simpson Road was one of the most luxurious in the city.

Estimates put the number of mourners who turned up to show their respects at around 75,000, with an additional 7,000 crammed the City Auditorium to witness a lavish memorial service. He was laid to rest at Lincoln Cemetery in Atlanta.

Tiger Flowers Cemetery in Lakeland, Florida was named for him.

Tiger Flowers Drive in Atlanta, Georgia is named for him.

Professional boxing record
All information in this section is derived from BoxRec, unless otherwise stated.

Official record

All newspaper decisions are officially regarded as “no decision” bouts and are not counted in the win/loss/draw column.

Unofficial record

Record with the inclusion of newspaper decisions to the win/loss/draw column.

See also
List of middleweight boxing champions

References

Further reading
Andrew M. Kaye, "The Canonisation of Tiger Flowers: A Black Hero for the 1920s," Borderlines: Studies in American Culture 5, no. 2 (1998): 142-59.
Andrew M. Kaye, The Pussycat of Prizefighting: Tiger Flowers and the Politics of Black Celebrity (Athens: University of Georgia Press, 2004).
Herman "Skip" Mason Jr., Black Atlanta in the Roaring Twenties (Dover, N.H.: Arcadia, 1997).
 A Tiger Rose out of Georgia: Tiger Flowers Champion of the World by Bob mee.

External links

Tiger Flowers - Cyber Boxing Zone Biography
IBHOF Bio - Tiger Flowers
Theodore "Tiger" Flowers historical marker

 https://boxrec.com/media/index.php/The_Ring_Magazine%27s_Annual_Ratings:_Middleweight--1920s
 https://titlehistories.com/boxing/wba/wba-world-m.html
 https://titlehistories.com/boxing/na/usa/ny/nysac-m.html

1895 births
1927 deaths
World boxing champions
People from Camilla, Georgia
International Boxing Hall of Fame inductees
Boxers from Georgia (U.S. state)
American male boxers
Middleweight boxers